The 2011–12 season was Ipswich Town's tenth consecutive season in The Football League Championship, the second-highest division in the English football league system.  In addition to competing in The Championship, Ipswich Town also competed in the League Cup and the FA Cup.

Ipswich were knocked out of the FA Cup in their first match, the third round, against Hull City and lost to Northampton Town in the first round of the League Cup.  Winning their final league match, Ipswich avoided their worst league finish for 55 years, ending the season in 15th position, and becoming the longest continually serving member of The Championship courtesy of Coventry City's relegation to League One.

Season summary

Pre-season
The 2011–12 season was Paul Jewell's first full season as manager of Ipswich Town. Many regular first-team players from the previous season left the club in the summer of 2011 including Márton Fülöp, Gareth McAuley and club captain David Norris. Young striker Connor Wickham was also sold to Sunderland on 29 June for a fee of over £8 million. New signings were made including strikers Michael Chopra and Jay Emmanuel-Thomas from Cardiff City and Arsenal respectively for fees of around £1 million each. Young left-back Aaron Cresswell was signed from Tranmere Rovers for a fee of around £250,000. Jewell also added experienced players to his squad, including former England internationals Lee Bowyer and Richard Wright, centre-backs Ívar Ingimarsson and Ibrahima Sonko, as well as striker Nathan Ellington who had previously played under Jewell at former clubs Wigan Athletic and Derby County. The previous seasons Player of the Season Jimmy Bullard was also signed permanently on a free transfer from Hull City following his loan spell the previous season. The loan signings of goalkeeper David Stockdale and Republic of Ireland internationals Keith Andrews and Daryl Murphy were also made to bolster the squad.

August to December
Ipswich made a winning start to the season, with new signing Michael Chopra scoring a brace in a 3–0 away win over Bristol City at Ashton Gate to take Ipswich to the top of the Championship table. Ipswich drew Football League Two side Northampton Town in the first round of the Football League Cup. Ipswich exited the League Cup at the first round following a 1–2 home loss, having initially lead the match through a goal from Jay Emmanuel-Thomas. The opening day league win was followed by a poor run of three straight losses in the league, including heavy defeats against Southampton and Peterborough United. Following this poor run, Ipswich managed to improve their form over the following eight games to get back into the play-off places. This improved run of form was followed by an appalling run of seven consecutive defeats to put Ipswich close to the relegation zone. This run looked set to continue as Ipswich found themselves 0–2 down at half-time away against Barnsley on 10 December, however an impressive second-half come-back saw Ipswich win the match 5–3 following second-half goals from Michael Chopra, Danny Collins, Jason Scotland and a brace from Keith Andrews. Ipswich followed this up with a 1–0 home win over Derby County at Portman Road,

January transfer window
Ipswich had a relatively quiet January transfer window, with goalkeeper Alex McCarthy joining on loan from Reading to provide competition following David Stockdale's loan return to Fulham in December. Scottish midfielder Ryan Stevenson was also signed from Heart of Midlothian for a fee of £50,000. There were no major departures from the club, although it was agreed that summer signing Ívar Ingimarsson's contract would be terminated by mutual consent, following which he decided to retire from football shortly after.

January to May
Another poor run followed leading up until late January, including a third round FA Cup exit to Hull City following a 3–1 away loss on 9 January. Ipswich managed to end this poor run with their biggest win of the season on 31 January, beating West Ham United 5–1 at Portman Road, with goals from Michael Chopra, Daryl Murphy, Lee Martin and a brace from Jay Emmanuel-Thomas. Ipswich went on to win the next three league matches to put a four game winning run together to take them away from the relegation zone. In February, Carlos Edwards took over as captain from current club captain Grant Leadbitter.

On 31 March 2012, the South Stand at Portman Road was renamed The Sir Alf Ramsey Stand in honour of former Ipswich and England manager Sir Alf Ramsey. The unveiling of the renamed stand took place before a home match against Barsnely. Prior to kick-off, club captain Carlos Edwards lead the Ipswich squad to applaud the members of the 1961–62 First Division title winning side including Ray Crawford, Andy Nelson, Larry Carberry, John Compton, Doug Moran and Ted Phillips, who had been invited to the club's directors box as part of the unveiling of The Sir Alf Ramsey Stand. Ipswich went on to win the match 1–0.

Ipswich followed-up their improved form in February with another consistent run throughout March, beginning the month with a 3–0 home win over Bristol City at Portman Road. Draws against Southampton and Hull City were followed by a 3–2 home win against Peterborough United, avenging the defeat to Peterborough earlier in the season. A run of 7 wins in 12 matches across February and March solidified Ipswich's place in mid-table following a poor first-half of the season.

Ipswich did not win any of their next five matches before ending the season with a 3–2 away win over Doncaster Rovers on the final day of the season, a match in which manager Paul Jewell gave academy graduate Byron Lawrence his first-team debut as a second-half substitute at the age of 16 years and 47 days old, making him the club's second youngest ever debutante after former striker Connor Wickham.

Post-season
An inconsistent season saw Ipswich finish 15th in the Championship, having not spent any time in the relegation zone during the season whilst never putting together a substantial challenge to get into the play-off places. The team suffered from a very poor defensive record, conceding 77 goals in the league, the joint second highest goals conceded of any team in the division, with only bottom placed side Doncaster Rovers conceding more goals than Ipswich, although only the division's top five placed sides scored more than Ipswich's 69 league goals, making them the highest scoring of any side to finish outside of the play-off positions. Striker Michael Chopra finished the season as Ipswich's top goal-scorer with 14 goals in his debut season at the club. Left-back Aaron Cresswell won the club's Player of the Season award for his excellent form during the campaign, with new skipper Carlos Edwards rounding off an impressive campaign by earning the Players' Player of the Season award. Striker Jason Scotland won the goal of the season award for his 25-yard equalizer away against Crystal Palace at Selhurst Park on 14 April.

First-team squad

Out on loan

First-team coaching staff

Pre-season

Competitions

Football League Championship

League table

Results summary

Results by round

Matches

August

September

October

November

December

January

February

March

April

FA Cup

Football League Cup

Transfers

Transfers in

Loans in

Transfers out

Loans out

New contracts

Squad statistics
All statistics updated as of end of season

Appearances and goals

|-
! colspan=14 style=background:#dcdcdc; text-align:center| Goalkeepers

|-
! colspan=14 style=background:#dcdcdc; text-align:center| Defenders

|-
! colspan=14 style=background:#dcdcdc; text-align:center| Midfielders

|-
! colspan=14 style=background:#dcdcdc; text-align:center| Forwards

|-
! colspan=14 style=background:#dcdcdc; text-align:center| Players transferred out during the season

Goalscorers

Clean sheets

Disciplinary record

Starting 11
Considering starts in all competitions

Awards

Player awards

References

2011–12
2011–12 Football League Championship by team